Yeokgok Station is a station on Seoul Subway Line 1 and the Gyeongin Line.

Vicinity

Exit 1 : Yeokgok Elementary & Middle Schools, Yeokgok Market.
Exit 2 : Buan Elementary School, Homeplus, McDonald’s,    Starbucks, CJ CGV

References

Seoul Metropolitan Subway stations
Metro stations in Bucheon
Railway stations opened in 1974